Mashq is one of the oldest calligraphic forms of the Arabic script. At the time of the emergence of Islam, this type of writing was likely already in use in various parts of the Arabian Peninsula. It is first attested during the reign of caliph Umar, making it one of the earliest forms of Arabic script, along with Hijazi and Kufic. It was used in most texts produced during the first and second centuries after the Hijra.

Etymology 
In Arabic, مَشَقَ mashaqa means "to stretch out" and the name مَشْق mashq references the fact that the letters د ,ص ,ط ,ك, and ى (as well as their dotted counterparts) are written stretched out. Mashq calligraphy is also notable for the shortened intervals between words.

The Arabic term for this script spread as a loanword throughout the Muslim world as the Arabic writing system spread. For example, mashq is known as meşk in Turkish and is practiced by present-day calligraphers.

See also 

 Ancient North Arabian script
 Ancient South Arabian script
 Hijazi script
 Kufic
 Muhaqqaq
 Naskh
 Persian calligraphy
 Rayhan
 Tawqi
 Thuluth

References

External links 
Mashq Sample Calligrapher:Mehmed Şevki Efendi
Qur'anic fragment dated to 107 AH / 725 CE, now in the Egyptian National Library

Arabic calligraphy